The 1972 South Pacific Touring Series was an Australian motor racing competition for Group E Series Production Touring Cars.
It was the third running of an annual series which had first been contested as the 1970 Tasman Touring Series.

The series was won by John Goss driving for McLeod Ford in a Ford Falcon GTHO.

Schedule
The series was contested over four rounds:

Each round was held as a support race to a round of the 1972 Tasman Championship for Drivers.

Classes
Competing cars were classified into four classes according to an assessed C.P. Units value for each vehicle.
Under this system, the engine capacity of the car (in litres) was multiplied by the retail price of the car (in Australian dollars) to arrive at a CP Unit value.

 Class A: 0 to 3000 C.P. Units
 Class B: 3001 to 9000 C.P. Units
 Class C: 9001 to 18000 C.P. Units
 Class D: 18001 & over C.P. Units

Points system
Points were awarded on a 4,3,2,1 basis for the first four outright places at each round.
In addition, points were awarded on a 9,8,7,6,5,4,3,2,1 basis for the first nine places in each class at each round.

Points were only awarded to a driver conditional upon them competing in the same make and model of car entered by the same entrant in all four rounds of the series.
The series win was awarded to a driver and entrant, who both received equal recognition.

Series standings

 Note: The above table shows only the top twelve placings in the series.

References

South Pacific Touring Series
South Pacific Touring Series